José Nélson de Almeida Moutinho (born 6 June 1959) is a Portuguese former footballer who played as a forward.

Club career
Born in Oeiras, Lisbon District, Moutinho amassed Primeira Liga totals of 54 matches and 12 goals over two seasons, representing in the competition Portimonense S.C. and S.C. Beira-Mar and being relegated with the former club in 1978 and the latter in 1980. The vast majority of his remaining career—15 years in total—was spent in the second division.

Personal life
Moutinho's son, João, is also a footballer. A midfielder, he previously represented Sporting CP, FC Porto and AS Monaco FC. He currently represents Wolves in addition to serving as a longtime Portugal international.

References

External links

1959 births
Living people
People from Oeiras, Portugal
Portuguese footballers
Association football forwards
Primeira Liga players
Liga Portugal 2 players
Segunda Divisão players
Portimonense S.C. players
S.C. Beira-Mar players
U.D. Leiria players
F.C. Barreirense players
Sport Benfica e Castelo Branco players
S.C. Olhanense players
Portugal youth international footballers
Portugal under-21 international footballers
Sportspeople from Lisbon District